Southern Mongolian or Inner Mongolian is a proposed major dialect group within the taxonomy of the Mongolian language.

Overview
It is assumed by most Inner Mongolia linguists and would be on the same level as the other three major dialect groups Khalkha, Buryat, Oirat. Southern Mongolian would consist of the dialects Chakhar, Ordos, Baarin, Khorchin, Kharchin and (possibly) Alasha that originated from Oirat. The varieties spoken in Xilin Gol which form a major dialect of their own right and are close to Khalkha are classified as belonging to Chakhar in this approach. Because Southern Mongolian would consist of all non-Buryat Mongolian varieties spoken in Inner Mongolia, this classification has been argued against by several linguists who hold that there is a dialect continuum between Khalkha and the Southern Mongolian varieties that rather favours grouping Chakhar, Ordos and Khalkha on the one hand and Khorchin and Kharchin on the other hand, or at least that "Mongolian proper" is an immediate member of Mongolian/Mongolic. On the other hand, the argument that Southern Mongolian is distinct is based on considerations such as the following:

 Southern Mongolian is the Standard dialect of Inner Mongolia, while Khalkha is the Standard language of the Mongolian state.
 Southern Mongolians continue to use the Mongolian script, while Khalkhas have switched to Cyrillic script, which rather closely resembles the pronunciation of the Khalkha dialect.
 Southern Mongolian has been under strong influence from Chinese, while Khalkha has been under strong influence from Russian.

Given its intended status that was formally implemented and delimited at a conference in Ürümqi in 1979, Southern Mongolian has been the object of several grammars. This includes an eclectic grammar that specifically deals with normative spoken language and which is based on the Chakhar dialect as spoken in the Plain Blue Banner on which the normative Southern Mongolian pronunciation Standard sounds is based. But legally, the grammar of all Southern Mongolian dialects jointly provides the standard grammar. This is still a delimitation, as Buryat and Oirat speakers in China are obliged to use Southern Mongolian as their standard variety as well. To work as a school teacher, news anchor etc., a special command of Southern Mongolian is required and tested. The test manual focuses mainly on pronunciation, but to some degree also on vocabulary, while syntax is stated to be tested, but left to the evaluators. To teach Mongolian, a score of more than 90% is needed, while teachers of other subjects are only required to obtain 80%, the minimum score for successful completion.

See also
Mongolian name

References

Bibliography 

 Bayancogtu (2007): Nutug-un ayalgun-u sinjilel. Hohhot. 
 Buu, Manliang (2005): Monggol yarian-u kele jüi. Hohhot.
 Činggeltei (1999): Odu üj-e-jin mongγul kelen-ü ǰüi. Kökeqota: Öbür mongγul-un arad-un keblel-ün qorij-a. .
 Janhunen, Juha (2003): Mongol dialects. In: Juha Janhunen (ed.): The Mongolic languages. London: Routledge: 177–191.
 Luvsanvandan, Š. (1959): Mongol hel ajalguuny učir. In: Mongolyn sudlal 1.
 [Committee (for the)] Mongγul kelen-ü barimǰiya abiyan-u kiri kem-i silγaqu kötülbüri (2003): Mongγul kelen-ü barimǰiya abiyan-u kiri kem-i silγaqu kötülbüri.
 Öbür mongγul-un yeke surγaγuli (2005 [1964]): Odu üy-e-yin mongγul kele. Kökeqota: Öbür mongγul-un arad-un keblel-ün qoriy-a. .
 Qaserdeni, Гunčugsüreng, Sungrub, Sečen, Davadaγva, Toγuga, Naranbatu (1996): Orčin čaγ-un mongγul kele. ǰasaču nayiraγuluγsan debter. Ulaγanqada: Öbür mongγul-un surγan kümüǰil-un keblel-ün qoriy-a. .
 Qaserdeni, Sečen, Buu Manliyang, Sangǰai, Tiyen Siyuu, Dorǰi (2006): Mongγul yariyan-u kele ǰüi. Kökeqota: Öbür mongγul-un arad-un keblel-ün qoriy-a. .
 Secen et al. (1998): Monggol helen-ü nutug-un ayalgun-u sinjilel. Beijing. 
 [Sečenbaγatur] Sechenbaatar (2003): The Chakhar dialect of Mongol - A morphological description. Helsinki: Finno-Ugrian society.
 Sečenbaγatur et al. (2005): Mongγul kelen-ü nutuγ-un ayalγun-u sinǰilel-ün uduridqal. Kökeqota: Öbür mongγul-un arad-un keblel-ün qoriy-a.
 Svantesson, Jan-Olof, Anna Tsendina, Anastasia Karlsson, Vivan Franzén (2005): The Phonology of Mongolian. New York: Oxford University Press.

Mongolic languages
Standard languages

External link 
 Southern Mongolia Congress
 Southern Mongolian National Party
 Mongolian liberal union party
 Southern Mongolian News
 Southern Mongolian Human Rights Information Center